Nguyễn Văn Trân (15 January 1917 – 7 December 2018) was a Vietnamese politician who served as Minister of Transport of North Vietnam (1955–1960).

References

1917 births
2018 deaths
Men centenarians
Vietnamese politicians
Vietnamese centenarians
Members of the 3rd Secretariat of the Workers' Party of Vietnam
Alternates of the 2nd Central Committee of the Workers' Party of Vietnam
Members of the 3rd Central Committee of the Workers' Party of Vietnam